Terziysko refers to the following places:

 Terziysko, Burgas Province, Bulgaria
 Terziysko, Lovech Province, Bulgaria